The Wheaton Park District is an organization dedicated to leisure and recreation in Wheaton, Illinois. It was incorporated in 1921, and now contains more than 800 acres of land. In addition to the many full-time employees, the park district also employs nearly 1,000 summer part-time staff, often local high school and college students. The National Recreation and Park Association has awarded the National Gold Medal Award for Excellence to the Wheaton Park District four times.

Activities 
The Wheaton Park District also organizes league sports for the citizens of Wheaton. These sports include baseball, softball, basketball, soccer, volleyball, lacrosse, football, and cheerleading. They also offer a variety of camps and programs for kids throughout the summer. Year-round, there are programs for children, youth, families, and adults at the community center.

Facilities 
It oversees the following facilities:

Aquatic Centers 
 Northside Family Aquatic Center
 Rice Pool and Water Park

Golf 
 Arrowhead Golf Club
 Clocktower Commons (mini-golf and skate park)

Fitness 
 Community Center
 Memorial Leisure Center
 Parks Plus Fitness Center

Recreation/Education 
 Lincoln Marsh Natural Area
 Safety City
 DuPage County Historical Museum
 Cosley Zoo

Parks 
There are 52 additional parks located in and around Wheaton that are open for community use.

References

External links 
 http://www.wheatonparkdistrict.com
 http://www.cosleyzoo.org
 http://www.nrpa.org/goldmedal/

Wheaton, Illinois
Park districts in Illinois
Protected areas of DuPage County, Illinois
1921 establishments in Illinois